Scolopendra galapagoensis, also known as the Galápagos centipede and Darwin's goliath centipede, is species of very large centipede in the family Scolopendridae. It is the only representative of the genus Scolopendra on the Galapagos Islands, among twelve other species of centipede present on the Islands. It is also found on mainland South America in Ecuador and Peru, and on Cocos Island in Costa Rica.

Appearance 
The Galápagos Centipede is one of the largest species of centipede in the world. Specimens have been recorded with lengths up to 30 cm.

Colour morphs 
Scolopendra galapagoensis exhibits three colour morphs:

Diet and predation 

S. galapagoensis has been reported preying on crickets, newborn rodents, the Galapagos Rice Rat, and, in one paper, a Floreana Racer snake. It is hunted by a variety of birds of prey including the Galapagos hawk, two species of mockingbird, and the common Black Rat.

References

Further reading & external links 
 Neotype designation and a diagnostic account for the centipede, Scolopendra gigantea L. 1758,with an account of S. galapagoensis Bollman 1889
 Scolopendra galapagoensis - Charles Darwin Foundation
 YouTube- Scolopendra galapagoensis (Orange Morph) behaviour in enclosure

galapagoensis
Animals described in 1889